Nikaea matsumurai is a moth in the family Erebidae first described by Yasunori Kishida in 1983. It is found in Taiwan and the Ryukyu Islands in Japan.

References

Moths described in 1855
Callimorphina